The Melbourne 400 (formally known as the Beaurepaires Melbourne 400) is an annual motor racing event for Supercars, held at the Albert Park Circuit in Melbourne, Victoria since 2018. The 2018 edition was the first time that a championship round was contested at the circuit, after several years of supporting the Australian Grand Prix as a non-championship event.
The event was cancelled in 2020 and 2021 due to the COVID-19 pandemic.

Format
The event is staged over a four-day weekend, from Thursday to Sunday, as a support category in the lead-up to the Australian Grand Prix. Two thirty-minute practice sessions, two fifteen-minute qualifying sessions to determine the starting grid for the first and second races, and race one are held on the Thursday; second race is held on Friday; two further fifteen-minute qualifying sessions to determine the starting grid for the third and fourth races, and race three are held on the Saturday; race four is held on Sunday.

Larry Perkins Trophy
The driver who accumulates the most points across the four races receives the "Larry Perkins Trophy", named in honour of the Supercars Hall of Fame inductee who also started eleven Formula One Grands Prix. The perpetual trophy was designed in collaboration between a student and senior lecturer at RMIT University and was partly created using 3D printing.

History
Supercars Championship have held non-championship events at the Australian Grand Prix dating back to its first appearance on the Formula One calendar in 1985. The support event, most recently known as the Supercars Challenge, was held in every year from 1985 to 2017 except 2007. After the demise of the event, the series finally attained championship status for the 2018 season.

The inaugural event saw four different winners across the four races, including Scott Pye's first championship race win in a dramatic third race of the weekend. Pye had taken the lead early in the race, and was among the drivers to remain on slick tyres during a late-race shower. Despite a brief off-track moment in the changing conditions, Pye held on for a narrow victory, the first for Walkinshaw Andretti United since the foreign investment in the team. One victory and three further podiums across the weekend saw Jamie Whincup take the overall event victory and the first Larry Perkins Trophy.

In the event's second year, Scott McLaughlin failed to win the event despite winning three of the four races across the weekend, including the 1,000th Australian Touring Car Championship race. In the other race, McLaughlin and Cameron Waters, who were first and second on the grid, clashed on the way to the grid, leaving both drivers out of the race. The race was won by Chaz Mostert, who also went on to win the round and the trophy.

The 2020 event, along with the 2020 Australian Grand Prix, was cancelled on the Friday morning of the event due to the COVID-19 pandemic. Two qualifying sessions had already been held the previous day. The event was included in the 2021 calendar, however was cancelled along with the Formula One round. The Grand Prix returned in 2022 to record crowds in Melbourne. The four races were shared equally between Mostert and Shane van Gisbergen, with the latter winning the trophy despite finishing the final race in 20th position due to a tyre failure.

Winners

Multiple winners

By team

By manufacturer

Event names and sponsors
2018: Coates Hire Melbourne 400
2019–20, 2022–: Beaurepaires Melbourne 400

See also
List of Australian Touring Car Championship races

References

Australian Grand Prix
 
Recurring sporting events established in 2018
Sports competitions in Melbourne
Supercars Championship races
2018 establishments in Australia